Sagarmatha Highway is a National Highway of Nepal that connects Khotang District to Saptari District via Udayapur District. At Kadmaha the Sagarmatha Highway joins Mahendra Highway which also called East–West National Highway which runs across the Terai geographical regions of Nepal.

The construction of the road began 23 years ago to link Diktel, the headquarters of Khotang with Gaighat of Udayapur. In 1994, the then Prime Minister Manmohan Adhikari had inaugurated the construction work at Bokse in Gaighat. The 156 kilometre long Sagarmatha Highway has been constructed with the primary aim of linking Diktel with the national road network.

References

Highways in Nepal
1994 establishments in Nepal